A ring road is a road that encircles a town, city or country. The article includes examples of ring roads.

Ring Road may also refer to:

Roads
 List of ring roads

Arts and entertainment
 Ring Road (film), a 2015 Indian Kannada-language film
 "Ring Road" (song), by Underworld, 2008
 Ring Roads, a translation of Les Boulevards de ceinture, a 1972 novel by Patrick Modiano

Other uses
 Ring languages, or Ring Road languages, in Cameroon

See also